The Assistant Secretary of the Treasury for International Markets is a senior official in the United States Department of the Treasury who heads a portfolio of the department's offices on international financial services issues, trade and investment policy, banking and securities, and U.S. relations with multilateral development banks.

The position was created on July 26, 2007, as part of the Foreign Investment and National Security Act of 2007. The position has changed names twice: it was originally called Assistant Secretary of the Treasury for International Affairs, then later changed to Assistant Secretary of the Treasury for International Markets and Development, before settling on its current name.

The Assistant Secretary is appointed by the President and confirmed by the Senate. The position is currently held by Alexia Latortue.

List of Assistant Secretaries of the Treasury for International Markets

See also
Assistant Secretary of the Treasury

References